Shawnee High School is a public high school located just southwest of Lima, Ohio.  It is part of the Shawnee Local School District.  They are members of the Western Buckeye League.

Student Clubs 
 STEM Club
 The Chief Newspaper
 Octagon Club
 Ecology Club
 German Club (Deutschklub)
 Spanish Club
 Academic Quiz Bowl
 Pep Band
 Jazz Band
 Art Club
 Stage Crew/Theatre

Ohio High School Athletic Association State Championships

Rod Arthur—AAA State Wrestling Champion, 98-pounds. 1981

Girls Cross Country – 1983 

Boys Soccer - 2022

Notable alumni
Steve Arlin, Ohio State University Baseball pitcher. In 1966 Arlin led Ohio State to the National Championship and was named the tournament’s Most Valuable Player. Former MLB Pitcher for San Diego Padres 1969 - 1974, and Cleveland Indians 1974.
Jim Baldridge, former news anchor for WHIO-TV
Jamar Butler, Ohio's Mr. Basketball of 2004, Former Ohio State men's basketball point guard
Randy Crites, U.S. Navy vice admiral
Ryan Downard, American football coach
Hugh Downs, broadcaster, television host, producer, and author
Brad Komminsk, Baseball Player

WBL Championships
Baseball -91, 88, 66, 65, 62, 58, 57, 55, 52

Basketball (Boys) -21, 20, 08, 04, 03, 98, 90, 66, 65, 64, 63, 62

Basketball (Girls) -11, 10

Cross Country (Boys) -06

Cross Country (Girls) -11, 86, 85

Football -08, 04, 66, 64, 63, 62

Golf -20, 17, 15, 10, 08, 01, 96, 88, 84, 82, 65, 64, 63

Soccer (Boys) -22, 21, 20, 19, 12(t), 10, 07, 06, 02

Soccer (Girls) -19, 11

Softball -11, 88

Swimming (Boys) - 20, 19, 18, 13, 12, 11, 10, 09, 08, 06, 01, 00

Swimming (Girls) - 13, 12, 11, 10, 09, 08, 07, 06, 05, 04, 03, 02, 01

Tennis (Boys) -18, 17, 15, 14, 13, 12, 11, 10, 09, 08, 02, 01, 00, 98, 96, 94, 93, 92, 91, 90, 88, 87, 86, 85, 84

Tennis (Girls) -19, 18, 17, 09, 08, 05, 04, 03, 99, 98, 97, 96, 95, 94, 93, 86, 85, 84, 83, 82

Track and Field (Boys) -93, 66, 65, 64, 63, 58, 56

Track and Field (Girls) -87, 86, 85, 84

Wrestling -88, 87, 86, 85

School Rivalries
Shawnee vs. Elida High School

Shawnee vs. Bath High School

Shawnee vs. Lima Central Catholic High School

Shawnee vs. Kenton High School

Shawnee vs. Lima Senior High (Basketball 1965 - 1967)

Shawnee vs. Wapakoneta High School

Shawnee Head Coaches
Fall Sports

Football: Jerry Cooper

Boys Soccer: Jason Hoehn

Girls Soccer: Caroline O'Brien

Volleyball: Amy Knight

Cross Country: Russ Holly

Boys Golf: Aaron Patterson

Girls Golf: Kirsty O'Connor

Girls Tennis: Nate Higgins

Winter Sports

Boys Basketball: Mark Triplett

Girls Basketball: Rachel Rumbaugh

Swimming: Scott Newman

Dive: Jamie Spyker

Wrestling: Michael Lewis

Spring Sports

Baseball: Jim Morris

Softball: John Young

Boys Tennis: Aaron Patterson

Track & Field: Michael Lewis

References

External links
 District Website
 Western Buckeye League official website

High schools in Allen County, Ohio
Buildings and structures in Lima, Ohio
Public high schools in Ohio